The Alaska Department of Education & Early Development (EED) is the state agency controlling primary and secondary education in Alaska. It is headquartered in Juneau.

References

External links

 Alaska Department of Education & Early Development
 

Alaska department
Education
State departments of education of the United States